Encebollado (Spanish: cooked with onions) is a fish stew from Ecuador, where it is regarded as a national dish. Although known throughout Ecuador, the dish is most popular in the country's coastal region. It is served with boiled cassava and pickled red onion rings. A dressing of onion is prepared with fresh tomato and spices such as pepper or coriander leaves. It is commonly prepared with albacore, but tuna, billfish, or bonito may also be used. It may be served with ripe avocado.

It possibly originates from the Basque dish by the name of marmitako.

Encebollado is usually served with banana chips, plantains, or bread as side dishes. It may be garnished with lime juice and chili sauce. People in Ecuador eat it for breakfast, lunch, or dinner. Restaurants that sell only this dish start serving it in the early morning.

See also
 List of Ecuadorian dishes and foods
 List of onion dishes

References

External links
 Recipe by Layla Pujol

Ecuadorian soups
Onion-based foods
National dishes
Fish stews